The women's softball tournament at the 2015 Pan American Games in Toronto, Canada, held at the Pan Am Ball Park in Ajax, Ontario from July 19 to 26.

For these Games, the women competed in a 6-team tournament. The teams were grouped into one single pool and all teams played each other in a round-robin preliminary round. The top four teams would advance to the semifinals.

Qualification
A total of six women's team qualified to compete at the games. Canada as host nation qualified automatically, along with the top five nations at the qualification event held in August 2013. Each team can contain a maximum of fifteen athletes.

Summary

Rosters

At the start of tournament, all six participating countries had up to 15 players on their rosters.

Medalists

Competition format
In the first round of the competition, teams were divided into one pool of six teams, and play followed round robin format with each of the teams playing all other teams in the pool once.

Following the completion of the pool games, the top four teams advanced to a page playoff round consisting of two semifinal games, and the final and grand final. All games were played over seven innings.

Results
The official detailed schedule was revealed on May 1, 2015.

All times are Eastern Daylight Time (UTC−4)

Preliminary round

Medal round

Semifinals

Bronze Medal Game

Gold Medal Game

Final standings

References

Softball at the 2015 Pan American Games